There are about 760 known moth species of Sierra Leone. The moths (mostly nocturnal) and butterflies (mostly diurnal) together make up the taxonomic order Lepidoptera.

This is a list of moth species which have been recorded in Sierra Leone.

Adelidae
Nemophora parvella (Walker, 1863)

Anomoeotidae
Anomoeotes leucolena Holland, 1893
Anomoeotes tenellula Holland, 1893
Anomoeotes triangularis Jordan, 1907

Arctiidae
Acantharctia mundata (Walker, 1865)
Afraloa bifurca (Walker, 1855)
Afrasura hyporhoda (Hampson, 1900)
Afrasura obliterata (Walker, 1864)
Afrowatsonius marginalis (Walker, 1855)
Alpenus investigatorum (Karsch, 1898)
Alpenus maculosa (Stoll, 1781)
Amata basithyris Hampson, 1914
Amata divalis (Schaus & Clements, 1893)
Amata francisca (Butler, 1876)
Amata marina (Butler, 1876)
Amata tomasina (Butler, 1876)
Amerila brunnea (Hampson, 1901)
Amerila leucoptera (Hampson, 1901)
Amerila luteibarba (Hampson, 1901)
Amerila puella (Fabricius, 1793)
Amerila vidua (Cramer, 1780)
Amerila vitrea Plötz, 1880
Amsacta latimarginalis Rothschild, 1933
Amsacta marginalis Walker, 1855
Anapisa preussi (Gaede, 1926)
Anapisa tristigma (Mabille, 1893)
Apisa canescens Walker, 1855
Argina leonina (Walker, 1865)
Asura atricraspeda Hampson, 1914
Balacra caeruleifascia Walker, 1856
Balacra humphreyi Rothschild, 1912
Binna penicillata Walker, 1865
Binna scita (Walker, 1865)
Caripodia albescens (Hampson, 1907)
Caripodia metaleuca Hampson, 1900
Caryatis phileta (Drury, 1782)
Caryatis syntomina Butler, 1878
Ceryx albimacula (Walker, 1854)
Creatonotos leucanioides Holland, 1893
Cyana basisticta (Hampson, 1914)
Cyana delicata (Walker, 1854)
Cyana rejecta (Walker, 1854)
Cyana trigutta (Walker, 1854)
Disparctia vittata (Druce, 1898)
Eilema albidula (Walker, 1864)
Eilema apicalis (Walker, 1862)
Eilema monochroma (Holland, 1893)
Epilacydes scita (Walker, 1865)
Estigmene flaviceps Hampson, 1907
Estigmene ochreomarginata Bethune-Baker, 1909
Estigmene unilinea Rothschild, 1910
Euchromia folletii (Guérin-Méneville, 1832)
Euchromia guineensis (Fabricius, 1775)
Euchromia hampsoni Seitz, 1926
Euchromia lethe (Fabricius, 1775)
Meganaclia perpusilla (Walker, 1856)
Meganaclia sippia (Plötz, 1880)
Metarctia burra (Schaus & Clements, 1893)
Myopsyche makomensis Strand, 1912
Myopsyche notoplagia Hampson, 1898
Neuroxena flammea (Schaus, 1893)
Nyctemera acraeina Druce, 1882
Nyctemera apicalis (Walker, 1854)
Nyctemera perspicua (Walker, 1854)
Nyctemera xanthura (Plötz, 1880)
Oedaleosia nigricosta Hampson, 1900
Palaeosiccia punctata Hampson, 1900
Paralpenus flavicosta (Hampson, 1909)
Phryganopsis cinerella (Wallengren, 1860)
Phryganopsis flavicosta Hampson, 1901
Pseudlepista flavicosta Hampson, 1910
Pseudothyretes perpusilla (Walker, 1856)
Pusiola celida (Bethune-Baker, 1911)
Radiarctia lutescens (Walker, 1854)
Rhipidarctia invaria (Walker, 1856)
Siccia cretata Hampson, 1914
Siccia paucipuncta Hampson, 1918
Spilosoma affinis Bartel, 1903
Spilosoma aurantiaca (Holland, 1893)
Spilosoma batesi (Rothschild, 1910)
Spilosoma curvilinea Walker, 1855
Spilosoma immaculata Bartel, 1903
Spilosoma occidens (Rothschild, 1910)
Spilosoma quadrilunata (Hampson, 1901)
Stenarctia abdominalis Rothschild, 1910
Thyretes negus Oberthür, 1878
Trichaeta bivittata (Walker, 1864)

Brachodidae
Nigilgia adjectella (Walker, 1863)
Dactyloceras lucina (Drury, 1872)

Cossidae
Phragmataecia fuscifusa Hampson, 1910
Xyleutes lunifera (Hampson, 1910)

Crambidae
Aethaloessa floridalis (Zeller, 1852)
Anania epipaschialis (Hampson, 1912)
Anania fusalis (Hampson, 1912)
Bissetia leucomeralis (Hampson, 1919)
Charltona albidalis Hampson, 1919
Chilo mesoplagalis (Hampson, 1919)
Cirrhochrista saltusalis Schaus & Clements, 1893
Cnaphalocrocis trapezalis (Guenée, 1854)
Conotalis aurantifascia (Hampson, 1895)
Cotachena smaragdina (Butler, 1875)
Diptychophora minimalis Hampson, 1919
Eporidia dariusalis Walker, 1859
Euclasta varii Popescu-Gorj & Constantinescu, 1973
Herpetogramma licarsisalis (Walker, 1859)
Lamprosema leucographalis (Hampson, 1912)
Lygropia amyntusalis (Walker, 1859)
Mesolia microdontalis (Hampson, 1919)
Metasia arida Hampson, 1913
Obtusipalpis albidalis Hampson, 1919
Orphanostigma fervidalis (Zeller, 1852)
Palpita elealis (Walker, 1859)
Patissa rufitinctalis Hampson, 1919
Pediasia melanerges (Hampson, 1919)
Phostria hesusalis (Walker, 1859)
Phostria ledereralis (Strand, 1920)
Phostria quadriguttata (Walker, 1869)
Phryganodes biguttata Hampson, 1898
Platytes duplicilinea (Hampson, 1919)
Pseudocatharylla argenticilia (Hampson, 1919)
Pycnarmon cribrata (Fabricius, 1794)
Pycnarmon sexpunctalis (Hampson, 1912)
Pycnarmon subpictalis (Hampson, 1912)
Pyrausta approximalis (Guenée, 1854)
Pyrausta phaenicealis (Hübner, 1818)
Scirpophaga ochritinctalis (Hampson, 1919)
Spoladea recurvalis (Fabricius, 1775)
Stemorrhages sericea (Drury, 1773)
Sufetula nigrescens Hampson, 1912
Sufetula sufetuloides (Hampson, 1919)
Syllepte leonalis (Schaus & Clements, 1893)
Syllepte torsipex (Hampson, 1898)
Zebronia phenice (Cramer, 1780)

Drepanidae
Epicampoptera strandi Bryk, 1913
Gonoreta opacifinis Watson, 1965
Gonoreta subtilis (Bryk, 1913)
Isospidia brunneola (Holland, 1893)
Negera confusa Walker, 1855
Negera natalensis (Felder, 1874)
Spidia fenestrata Butler, 1878
Spidia planola Watson, 1965
Spidia subviridis (Warren, 1899)

Elachistidae
Orophia melicoma (Meyrick, 1931)
Orophia taurina (Meyrick, 1928)

Eriocottidae
Compsoctena ursulella (Walker, 1863)

Eupterotidae
Acrojana sciron (Druce, 1887)
Acrojana simillima Rothschild, 1932
Acrojana splendida Rothschild, 1917
Camerunia orphne (Schaus, 1893)
Drepanojana fasciata Aurivillius, 1893
Hoplojana soricis Rothschild, 1917
Jana eurymas Herrich-Schäffer, 1854
Jana strigina Westwood, 1849
Phiala cunina Cramer, 1780
Phiala odites Schaus, 1893
Phiala venusta (Walker, 1865)
Stenoglene giganteus (Rothschild, 1917)
Stenoglene nivalis (Rothschild, 1917)
Stenoglene thelda (Druce, 1887)

Gelechiidae
Dichomeris eurynotus (Walsingham, 1897)
Pectinophora gossypiella (Saunders, 1844)

Geometridae
Aletis helcita (Linnaeus, 1763)
Allochrostes impunctata (Warren, 1897)
Antitrygodes dentilinea Warren, 1897
Apatadelpha biocellaria (Walker, 1863)
Archichlora viridimacula Warren, 1898
Bathycolpodes kabaria (Swinhoe, 1904)
Bathycolpodes marginata (Warren, 1897)
Biston abruptaria (Walker, 1869)
Cartaletis gracilis (Möschler, 1887)
Chiasmia conturbata (Warren, 1898)
Chiasmia impar (Warren, 1897)
Chiasmia ostentosaria (Möschler, 1887)
Chiasmia rectistriaria (Herrich-Schäffer, 1854)
Chiasmia streniata (Guenée, 1858)
Chlorissa afflictaria (Swinhoe, 1904)
Chlorissa malescripta (Warren, 1897)
Chloroclystis sierraria Swinhoe, 1904
Chlorodrepana angustimargo Warren, 1901
Coenina aurivena Butler, 1898
Cyclophora leonaria (Walker, 1861)
Derambila costipunctata Warren, 1905
Derambila syllaria (Swinhoe, 1904)
Epigynopteryx fimosa (Warren, 1905)
Ereunetea minor (Holland, 1893)
Eucrostes beatificata (Walker, 1863)
Geodena bandajoma Swinhoe, 1904
Geodena marginalis Walker, 1856
Geodena quadrigutta Walker, 1856
Geodena semihyalina Swinhoe, 1904
Gonochlora minutaria Swinhoe, 1904
Heterostegane pleninotata Warren, 1901
Hyalornis docta (Schaus & Clements, 1893)
Idaea macrostyla (Warren, 1900)
Idaea pulveraria (Snellen, 1872)
Idaea submaculata (Warren, 1898)
Idiochlora approximans (Warren, 1897)
Larentia attenuata (Walker, 1862)
Lophorrhachia palliata (Warren, 1898)
Melinoessa aureola Prout, 1934
Melinoessa fulvata (Drury, 1773)
Melinoessa perlimbata (Guenée, 1857)
Melinoessa sodaliata (Walker, 1862)
Mesocolpia marmorata (Warren, 1899)
Mesothisa flaccida Warren, 1905
Metallospora catori Warren, 1905
Miantochora incolorata Warren, 1899
Miantochora venerata (Mabille, 1879)
Mimaletis albipennis Warren, 1905
Narthecusa tenuiorata Walker, 1862
Neostega flaviguttata Warren, 1903
Oxyfidonia fulvida Warren, 1905
Oxyfidonia insolita (Warren, 1905)
Paramilionia rubroplagata Bethune-Baker, 1906
Perithalera oblongata (Warren, 1898)
Pingasa rhadamaria (Guenée, 1858)
Pingasa ruginaria (Guenée, 1858)
Pitthea continua Walker, 1854
Pitthea famula Drury, 1773
Pitthea rubriplaga Warren, 1897
Plegapteryx anomalus Herrich-Schäffer, 1856
Problepsis digammata Kirby, 1896
Problepsis flavistigma Swinhoe, 1904
Problepsis ochripicta Warren, 1901
Scopula cervinata (Warren, 1905)
Scopula inscriptata (Walker, 1863)
Scopula lactaria (Walker, 1861)
Scopula laevipennis (Warren, 1897)
Scopula minorata (Boisduval, 1833)
Scopula natalica (Butler, 1875)
Scopula ossicolor (Warren, 1897)
Scopula planipennis (Warren, 1900)
Scopula pseudophema Prout, 1920
Scopula serena Prout, 1920
Somatina impunctulata (Warren, 1901)
Somatina nucleata Warren, 1905
Somatina subviridata Warren, 1901
Somatina virginalis Prout, 1917
Terina renifera Warren, 1897
Terina subfulva (Warren, 1905)
Thalassodes dentatilinea Prout, 1912
Thenopa nigraria (Swinhoe, 1904)
Thetidia undulilinea (Warren, 1905)
Traminda obversata (Walker, 1861)
Unnamed genus Ennominae penumbrata (Warren, 1905)
Xenochroma salsa (Warren, 1897)
Xenostega tincta Warren, 1899
Zamarada acrochra Prout, 1928
Zamarada adumbrata D. S. Fletcher, 1974
Zamarada amymone Prout, 1934
Zamarada bicuspida D. S. Fletcher, 1974
Zamarada clementi Herbulot, 1975
Zamarada corroborata Herbulot, 1954
Zamarada cydippe Herbulot, 1954
Zamarada dilucida Warren, 1909
Zamarada eucharis (Drury, 1782)
Zamarada euerces Prout, 1928
Zamarada euphrosyne Oberthür, 1912
Zamarada flavicosta Warren, 1897
Zamarada ilaria Swinhoe, 1904
Zamarada indicata D. S. Fletcher, 1974
Zamarada ixiaria Swinhoe, 1904
Zamarada labifera Prout, 1915
Zamarada leona Gaede, 1915
Zamarada lepta D. S. Fletcher, 1974
Zamarada melanopyga Herbulot, 1954
Zamarada melpomene Oberthür, 1912
Zamarada mimesis D. S. Fletcher, 1974
Zamarada nasuta Warren, 1897
Zamarada perlepidata (Walker, 1863)
Zamarada platycephala D. S. Fletcher, 1974
Zamarada protrusa Warren, 1897
Zamarada reflexaria (Walker, 1863)
Zamarada regularis D. S. Fletcher, 1974
Zamarada sicula D. S. Fletcher, 1974
Zamarada subinterrupta Gaede, 1915
Zamarada vulpina Warren, 1897

Glyphipterigidae
Glyphipterix gemmatella (Walker, 1864)

Gracillariidae
Acrocercops eurhythmopa Meyrick, 1934
Acrocercops leucostega (Meyrick, 1932)
Acrocercops siphonaula Meyrick, 1931
Spulerina hexalocha (Meyrick, 1912)

Himantopteridae
Pseudothymara staudingeri (Rogenhofer, 1888)

Hyblaeidae
Hyblaea tenuis Walker, 1866

Immidae
Imma acroptila Meyrick, 1906

Lasiocampidae
Cheligium lineatum (Aurivillius, 1893)
Chrysopsyche mirifica (Butler, 1878)
Cleopatrina bilinea (Walker, 1855)
Eucraera magna (Aurivillius, 1908)
Filiola dogma Zolotuhin & Gurkovich, 2009
Filiola fulgurata (Aurivillius, 1909)
Filiola lanceolata (Hering, 1932)
Gelo calcarales Zolotuhin & Prozorov, 2010
Gonometa nysa Druce, 1887
Gonopacha brotoessa (Holland, 1893)
Lechriolepis citrina Schaus, 1897
Lechriolepis heres Schaus, 1912
Leipoxais directa (Walker, 1865)
Leipoxais marginepunctata Holland, 1893
Mimopacha cinerascens (Holland, 1893)
Morongea lampara Zolotuhin & Prozorov, 2010
Morongea mastodont Zolotuhin & Prozorov, 2010
Odontocheilopteryx conzolia Gurkovich & Zolotuhin, 2009
Oplometa cassandra (Druce, 1887)
Philotherma sordida Aurivillius, 1905
Schausinna clementsi (Schaus, 1897)
Stenophatna dentata (Aurivillius, 1899)
Stoermeriana basale (Walker, 1855)
Stoermeriana cervina (Aurivillius, 1927)
Streblote postalbidum Schaus
Streblote splendens (Druce, 1887)

Limacodidae
Altha rubrifusalis Hampson, 1910
Brachiopsis conjunctoides Hering, 1933
Cosuma rugosa Walker, 1855
Latoia canescens (Walker, 1855)
Latoia picta (Walker, 1855)
Miresa gliricidiae Hering, 1933
Natada desperata Hering, 1928
Niphadolepis seleniphora Hering, 1933
Parasa semiochracea Hering, 1933
Susica molybdea Hampson, 1910
Trachyptena nigromaculata Hering, 1928
Zinara ploetzi Schaus & Clements, 1893

Lymantriidae
Aroa danva Schaus & Clements, 1893
Aroa leonensis Hampson, 1910
Batella lampra (Hering, 1926)
Batella muscosa (Holland, 1893)
Conigephyra discolepia (Hampson, 1910)
Crorema mentiens Walker, 1855
Dasychira bacchans (Karsch, 1898)
Dasychira citana (Schaus & Clements, 1893)
Dasychira goodii (Holland, 1893)
Dasychira leucogramma Hampson, 1910
Dasychira lulua Collenette, 1937
Dasychira robusta (Walker, 1855)
Dasychira suspecta Hering, 1926
Dasychira thermoplaga Hampson, 1910
Dasychira ticana Schaus & Clements, 1893
Eudasychira georgiana (Fawcett, 1900)
Euproctis conizona Collenette, 1933
Euproctis consocia Walker, 1865
Euproctis discipuncta (Holland, 1893)
Euproctis pygmaea (Walker, 1855)
Griveaudyria ila (Swinhoe, 1904)
Heteronygmia manicata (Aurivillius, 1892)
Knappetra fasciata (Walker, 1855)
Laelia dochmia Collenette, 1960
Laelia eutricha Collenette, 1931
Laelia fracta Schaus & Clements, 1893
Laelia rosea Schaus & Clements, 1893
Laelia subrosea (Walker, 1855)
Leucoma luteipes (Walker, 1855)
Marbla divisa (Walker, 1855)
Marblepsis flabellaria (Fabricius, 1787)
Naroma signifera Walker, 1856
Naroma varipes (Walker, 1865)
Neomardara africana (Holland, 1893)
Olene basalis (Walker, 1855)
Otroeda aino (Bryk, 1915)
Otroeda cafra (Drury, 1780)
Otroeda hesperia (Cramer, 1779)
Otroeda nerina (Drury, 1780)
Paqueta chloroscia (Hering, 1926)
Paramarbla indentata (Holland, 1893)
Pseudostracilla infausta Hering, 1926
Rahona ladburyi (Bethune-Baker, 1911)
Somatoxena lasea (Druce, 1899)

Metarbelidae
Haberlandia rabiusi Lehmann, 2011
Melisomimas metallica Hampson, 1914
Ortharbela obliquifascia (Hampson, 1910)
Paralebedella schultzei (Aurivillius, 1905)
Salagena transversa Walker, 1865
Teragra angulifascia Gaede, 1929
Teragra umbrifera Hampson, 1910

Noctuidae
Achaea albicilia (Walker, 1858)
Achaea albifimbria (Walker, 1869)
Achaea boris (Geyer, 1837)
Achaea catocaloides Guenée, 1852
Achaea echo (Walker, 1858)
Achaea ezea (Cramer, 1779)
Achaea faber Holland, 1894
Achaea finita (Guenée, 1852)
Achaea illustrata Walker, 1858
Achaea indicabilis Walker, 1858
Achaea intercisa Walker, 1865
Achaea lienardi (Boisduval, 1833)
Achaea occidens (Hampson, 1913)
Acontia citrelinea Bethune-Baker, 1911
Acontia glaphyra Holland, 1894
Acontia hemiselenias (Hampson, 1918)
Acontia insocia (Walker, 1857)
Acrapex spoliata (Walker, 1863)
Agoma trimenii (Felder, 1874)
Agrotis talda (Schaus & Clements, 1893)
Amblyprora magnifica (Schaus & Clements, 1893)
Amyna axis Guenée, 1852
Anachrostis metaphaea Hampson, 1926
Anigraea siccata (Hampson, 1905)
Anomis fulvida Guenée, 1852
Anomis leona (Schaus & Clements, 1893)
Araeopteron canescens (Walker, 1865)
Araeopteron griseata Hampson, 1907
Argyrogramma signata (Fabricius, 1775)
Asota speciosa (Drury, 1773)
Aspidifrontia hemileuca (Hampson, 1909)
Athyrma discimacula Hampson, 1926
Audea endophaea Hampson, 1913
Authadistis nyctichroa Hampson, 1926
Autoba brachygonia (Hampson, 1910)
Avitta atripuncta Hampson, 1926
Blasticorhinus trichopoda Hampson, 1926
Brithodes bathisalis (Walker, 1859)
Caligatus angasii Wing, 1850
Callopistria maillardi (Guenée, 1862)
Campydelta campyla (Hampson, 1909)
Cerynea trichobasis Hampson, 1910
Condica pauperata (Walker, 1858)
Cophanta occidentalis Hampson, 1910
Crameria amabilis (Drury, 1773)
Cretonia platyphaeella Walker, 1866
Cyligramma amblyops Mabille, 1891
Cyligramma fluctuosa (Drury, 1773)
Cyligramma limacina (Guérin-Méneville, 1832)
Dysgonia abnegans (Walker, 1858)
Dysgonia conjunctura (Walker, 1858)
Dysgonia humilis Holland, 1894
Dysgonia multilineata (Holland, 1894)
Dysgonia palpalis (Walker, 1865)
Dysgonia torrida (Guenée, 1852)
Dysgonia trogosema (Hampson, 1913)
Elaphria plectilis (Guenée, 1852)
Entomogramma pardus Guenée, 1852
Episparis fenestrifera Bryk, 1915
Episparis gomphiona Hampson, 1926
Ercheia subsignata (Walker, 1865)
Ericeia congregata (Walker, 1858)
Eublemma albicosta Hampson, 1910
Eublemma apicipunctum (Saalmüller, 1891)
Eublemma carneotincta Hampson, 1910
Eublemma colla (Schaus, 1893)
Eublemma exigua (Walker, 1858)
Eublemma ochrochroa Hampson, 1910
Eublemma orthogramma (Snellen, 1872)
Eublemma sciaphora Hampson, 1910
Eudrapa basipunctum Walker, 1858
Eutelia melanopis Hampson, 1905
Eutelia nigridentula Hampson, 1905
Eutelia snelleni Saalmüller, 1881
Eutelia subrubens (Mabille, 1890)
Feliniopsis africana (Schaus & Clements, 1893)
Feliniopsis gueneei (Laporte, 1973)
Feliniopsis thoracica (Walker, 1858)
Gesonia obeditalis Walker, 1859
Grammodes stolida (Fabricius, 1775)
Helicoverpa assulta (Guenée, 1852)
Heliophisma catocalina Holland, 1894
Heliophisma klugii (Boisduval, 1833)
Heliophisma xanthoptera (Hampson, 1910)
Heraclia catori (Jordan, 1904)
Heraclia geryon (Fabricius, 1781)
Heraclia hornimani (Druce, 1880)
Heraclia pallida (Walker, 1854)
Heraclia terminatis (Walker, 1856)
Holocryptis melanosticta Hampson, 1910
Holocryptis permaculata Hampson, 1910
Hydrillodes janalis Schaus & Clements, 1893
Hypena ducalis Schaus & Clemens, 1893
Hypena saltalis Schaus & Clemens, 1893
Hypena laceratalis Walker, 1859
Hypena obacerralis Walker, [1859]
Hypocala tenuis Walker, 1866
Hypopyra capensis Herrich-Schäffer, 1854
Hyposada hydrocampata (Guenée, 1858)
Hyposada juncturalis (Walker, 1866)
Ilyrgis ethiopica Hampson, 1926
Leoniloma convergens Hampson, 1926
Leucania insulicola Guenée, 1852
Libystica crenata Hampson, 1926
Libystica eucampima Hampson, 1926
Lithacodia blandula (Guenée, 1862)
Lophiophora purpurata (Hampson, 1926)
Lophoptera litigiosa (Boisduval, 1833)
Marcipa secticona Hampson, 1926
Marcipa talusina (Schaus & Clements, 1893)
Massaga hesparia (Cramer, 1775)
Massaga maritona Butler, 1868
Maxera nigriceps (Walker, 1858)
Melionica bertha (Schaus, 1893)
Metagarista aziyade Vuillot, 1892
Metagarista maenas (Herrich-Schäffer, 1853)
Metagarista triphaenoides Walker, 1854
Mimasura asticta Hampson, 1910
Mimasura disticta Hampson, 1910
Miniodes discolor Guenée, 1852
Miniodes phaeosoma Hampson, 1913
Mitrophrys magna (Walker, 1854)
Mitrophrys menete (Cramer, 1775)
Mocis conveniens (Walker, 1858)
Mocis mayeri (Boisduval, 1833)
Neostichtis nigricostata (Hampson, 1908)
Oglasa holophaea Hampson, 1926
Ophiusa conspicienda (Walker, 1858)
Ophiusa dilecta Walker, 1865
Ophiusa rufescens (Hampson, 1913)
Oruza latifera (Walker, 1869)
Orygmophora mediofoveata Hampson, 1926
Pangrapta eucraspeda Hampson, 1926
Pangrapta seriopuncta Hampson, 1926
Panilla hadrastis Hampson, 1926
Parachalciope benitensis (Holland, 1894)
Parachalciope euclidicola (Walker, 1858)
Parafodina ectrogia (Hampson, 1926)
Paralephana consocia Hampson, 1926
Paralephana costisignata Hampson, 1926
Phytometra duplicalis (Walker, 1866)
Phytometra silona (Schaus & Clements, 1893)
Plecoptera leucosticha Hampson, 1926
Plecopterodes moderata (Wallengren, 1860)
Polytelodes florifera (Walker, 1858)
Pseudoarcte melanis (Mabille, 1890)
Pseudogiria hypographa (Hampson, 1926)
Rhesala moestalis (Walker, 1866)
Rivula craspisticta Hampson, 1926
Schausia gladiatoria (Holland, 1893)
Schausia leona (Schaus, 1893)
Soloe trigutta Walker, 1854
Spodoptera cilium Guenée, 1852
Spodoptera exempta (Walker, 1857)
Spodoptera mauritia (Boisduval, 1833)
Spodoptera triturata (Walker, 1857)
Tavia nyctombra Hampson, 1926
Tavia polycyma Hampson, 1926
Thiacidas schausi (Hampson, 1905)
Toana acidalica Hampson, 1910
Tolna sypnoides (Butler, 1878)
Tolna versicolor Walker, 1869
Trigonodes hyppasia (Cramer, 1779)
Ugia rufilinea Hampson, 1926
Uripao albizonata Hampson, 1926

Nolidae
Arcyophora polla (Schaus, 1893)
Blenina chloromelana (Mabille, 1890)
Blenina miota Hampson, 1905
Characoma miophora Hampson, 1912
Earias biplaga Walker, 1866
Earias cupreoviridis (Walker, 1862)
Hesperothripa dicyma Hampson, 1912
Leocyma camilla (Druce, 1887)
Nanarhyncha nolophaea Hampson, 1918
Negeta luminosa (Walker, 1858)
Negeta mesoleuca (Holland, 1894)
Neonegeta pollusca (Schaus, 1893)
Nola flaviciliata (Hampson, 1901)
Nola furvitincta (Hampson, 1914)
Nola major Hampson, 1891
Nola melanoscelis (Hampson, 1914)
Nola transecta Hampson, 1901
Pardasena minorella Walker, 1866
Pardasena roeselioides (Walker, 1858)
Pardoxia graellsii (Feisthamel, 1837)
Selepa leucogonia (Hampson, 1905)
Westermannia agrapha Hampson, 1905

Notodontidae
Afrocerura leonensis (Hampson, 1910)
Amphiphalera leuconephra Hampson, 1910
Antheua rufovittata (Aurivillius, 1901)
Antheua simplex Walker, 1855
Antheua trifasciata (Hampson, 1909)
Antheua vittata (Walker, 1855)
Atrasana rectilinea (Gaede, 1928)
Brachychira elegans Aurivillius, 1907
Catarctia divisa (Walker, 1855)
Catarctia rothschildi (Kiriakoff, 1955)
Desmeocraera albicans Gaede, 1928
Desmeocraera bitioides (Holland, 1893)
Diopeithes cyamina Kiriakoff, 1958
Enomotarcha chloana (Holland, 1893)
Epidonta brunneomixta (Mabille, 1897)
Janthinisca flavipennis (Hampson, 1910)
Lamoriodes metaleuca Hampson, 1910
Odontoperas archonta Kiriakoff, 1959
Rasemia citaria (Schaus, 1893)
Rasemia macrodonta (Hampson, 1909)
Scalmicauda molestula Kiriakoff, 1959
Scrancia accipites (Schaus, 1893)
Stauropussa chloe (Holland, 1893)
Synete olivaceofusca (Rothschild, 1917)
Tmetopteryx bisecta (Rothschild, 1917)
Tricholoba atriclathrata Hampson, 1910
Ulinella xylostola (Hampson, 1910)
Utidaviana citana (Schaus, 1893)

Oecophoridae
Calliphractis phyllograpta Meyrick, 1928
Epiphractis superciliaris Meyrick, 1930
Stathmopoda auriferella (Walker, 1864)

Psychidae
Acanthopsyche sierricola (White, 1858)
Eumeta cervina Druce, 1887
Metisa aethiops (Hampson, 1910)

Pterophoridae
Megalorhipida leucodactylus (Fabricius, 1794)
Pterophorus candidalis (Walker, 1864)

Pyralidae
Eldana saccharina Walker, 1865
Endotricha niveifimbrialis Hampson, 1906
Endotricha vinolentalis Ragonot, 1891
Palmia adustalis (Hampson, 1917)
Paraglossa zonalis Hampson, 1906

Saturniidae
Aurivillius arata (Westwood, 1849)
Aurivillius triramis Rothschild, 1907
Carnegia mirabilis (Aurivillius, 1895)
Epiphora boolana Strand, 1909
Holocerina angulata (Aurivillius, 1893)
Imbrasia epimethea (Drury, 1772)
Lobobunaea acetes (Westwood, 1849)
Lobobunaea phaedusa (Drury, 1782)
Micragone herilla (Westwood, 1849)
Micragone nenia (Westwood, 1849)
Nudaurelia alopia Westwood, 1849
Nudaurelia eblis Strecker, 1876
Nudaurelia jamesoni (Druce, 1890)
Nudaurelia mitfordi (Kirby, 1892)
Nudaurelia staudingeri Aurivillius, 1893
Nudaurelia xanthomma (Rothschild, 1907)
Pselaphelia gemmifera (Butler, 1878)
Pseudobunaea alinda (Sonthonnax, 1899)

Sesiidae
Camaegeria exochiformis (Walker, 1856)
Camaegeria monogama (Meyrick, 1932)
Chamanthedon brillians (Beutenmüller, 1899)
Chamanthedon striata Gaede, 1929
Episannina zygaenura (Meyrick, 1933)
Lepidopoda sylphina Hampson, 1919
Lophoceps quinquepuncta Hampson, 1919
Melittia chlorophila (Hering, 1935)
Paranthrene anthrax Le Cerf, 1916
Synanthedon rubripicta Hampson, 1919
Tipulamima nigriceps Hampson, 1919
Vespaegeria typica Strand, 1913

Sphingidae
Acanthosphinx guessfeldti (Dewitz, 1879)
Acherontia atropos (Linnaeus, 1758)
Antinephele achlora Holland, 1893
Antinephele anomala (Butler, 1882)
Antinephele lunulata Rothschild & Jordan, 1903
Antinephele maculifera Holland, 1889
Atemnora westermannii (Boisduval, 1875)
Basiothia medea (Fabricius, 1781)
Centroctena rutherfordi (Druce, 1882)
Cephonodes hylas (Linnaeus, 1771)
Chloroclanis virescens (Butler, 1882)
Daphnis nerii (Linnaeus, 1758)
Hippotion celerio (Linnaeus, 1758)
Hippotion eson (Cramer, 1779)
Hypaedalea butleri Rothschild, 1894
Hypaedalea insignis Butler, 1877
Leucostrophus commasiae (Walker, 1856)
Macroglossum trochilus (Hübner, 1823)
Macropoliana natalensis (Butler, 1875)
Neopolyptychus pygarga (Karsch, 1891)
Nephele accentifera (Palisot de Beauvois, 1821)
Nephele funebris (Fabricius, 1793)
Nephele oenopion (Hübner, [1824])
Nephele peneus (Cramer, 1776)
Nephele rectangulata Rothschild, 1895
Nephele rosae Butler, 1875
Phylloxiphia bicolor (Rothschild, 1894)
Phylloxiphia formosa (Schultze, 1914)
Phylloxiphia goodii (Holland, 1889)
Phylloxiphia illustris (Rothschild & Jordan, 1906)
Phylloxiphia oweni (Carcasson, 1968)
Platysphinx phyllis Rothschild & Jordan, 1903
Platysphinx vicaria Jordan, 1920
Polyptychus affinis Rothschild & Jordan, 1903
Polyptychus andosa Walker, 1856
Polyptychus anochus Rothschild & Jordan, 1906
Polyptychus carteri (Butler, 1882)
Polyptychus nigriplaga Rothschild & Jordan, 1903
Polyptychus orthographus Rothschild & Jordan, 1903
Polyptychus retusus Rothschild & Jordan, 1908
Pseudoclanis occidentalis Rothschild & Jordan, 1903
Pseudoclanis postica (Walker, 1856)
Pseudoclanis rhadamistus (Fabricius, 1781)
Rufoclanis rosea (Druce, 1882)
Temnora crenulata (Holland, 1893)
Temnora eranga (Holland, 1889)
Temnora funebris (Holland, 1893)
Temnora iapygoides (Holland, 1889)
Temnora plagiata Walker, 1856
Temnora pseudopylas (Rothschild, 1894)
Temnora sardanus (Walker, 1856)
Temnora spiritus (Holland, 1893)
Temnora stevensi Rothschild & Jordan, 1903
Theretra jugurtha (Boisduval, 1875)
Theretra orpheus (Herrich-Schäffer, 1854)

Thyrididae
Byblisia albaproxima Bethune-Baker, 1911
Byblisia latipes Walker, 1865
Byblisia setipes (Plötz, 1880)
Chrysotypus dawsoni Distant, 1897
Dysodia vitrina (Boisduval, 1829)
Dysodia zelleri (Dewitz, 1881)
Marmax hyparchus (Cramer, 1779)
Marmax iridea (Mabille, 1892)
Marmax semiaurata (Walker, 1854)
Marmax vicaria (Walker, 1854)
Ninia plumipes (Drury, 1782)
Striglina clathrata (Hampson, 1897)
Trichobaptes auristrigata (Plötz, 1880)

Tineidae
Afrocelestis inanis Gozmány, 1968
Afrocelestis sacculata Gozmány, 1968
Agnathosia byrsinopa (Meyrick, 1933)
Ceratophaga tenebrosa Gozmány, 1968
Criticonoma doliopis (Meyrick, 1932)
Crypsithyris concolorella (Walker, 1863)
Cylicobathra cuspidata (Gozmány, 1968)
Ecpeptamena esotera Gozmány, 1968
Edosa endroedyi (Gozmány, 1966)
Erechthias travestita (Gozmány, 1968)
Galachrysis armata Gozmány, 1968
Hyperbola bradleyi Gozmány, 1966
Hyperbola pastoralis (Meyrick, 1931)
Machaeropteris euthysana Meyrick, 1931
Nannotinea holovalva Gozmány, 1968
Oinophila argyrospora Meyrick, 1931
Organodesma heptazona (Meyrick, 1931)
Perissomastix stibarodes (Meyrick, 1908)
Phalloscardia semiumbrata (Meyrick, 1920)
Phereoeca praecox Gozmány & Vári, 1973
Phereoeca proletaria (Meyrick, 1921)
Pitharcha atrisecta (Meyrick, 1918)
Pitharcha chalinaea Meyrick, 1908
Semeoloncha penicillata Gozmány, 1968
Setomorpha rutella Zeller, 1852
Silosca licziae Gozmány, 1967
Sphallestasis forficula (Gozmány, 1968)
Syncalipsis myrmecozelis Gozmány, 1968
Syncalipsis triangularis Gozmány, 1968
Tinea atomosella Walker, 1863
Tinea subalbidella Stainton, 1867

Tortricidae
Cosmorrhyncha acrocosma (Meyrick, 1908)
Cydia hemisphaerana (Walsingham, 1897)
Eccopsis wahlbergiana Zeller, 1852
Grapholita confertana Walker, 1864
Mictocommosis microctenota (Meyrick, 1933)
Olethreutes cybicopa (Meyrick, 1933)
Proschistis petromacha (Meyrick, 1931)
Rhodotoxotis arciferana (Mabille, 1900)
Thaumatotibia batrachopa (Meyrick, 1908)
Tortrix dinota Meyrick, 1918

Uraniidae
Dirades theclata (Guenée, 1858)
Epiplema confuscata Warren, 1909
Epiplema rotunda Warren, 1909
Epiplema subdistincta Warren, 1905

Xyloryctidae
Eretmocera laetissima Zeller, 1852

Zygaenidae
Homophylotis catori Jordan, 1907
Metanycles contracta Walker, 1864
Saliunca aurifrons Walker, 1864
Saliunca solora (Plötz, 1880)
Saliunca styx (Fabricius, 1775)
Syringura triplex (Plötz, 1880)
Tascia instructa (Walker, 1854)

See also 
 List of butterflies of Sierra Leone
 Wildlife of Sierra Leone

References

External links 
 

Sierra Leone
Sierra Leone
Moths
Sierra Leone
Sierra Leone